Agripa Mwausegha (born 30 June 1956) is a Malawian former sprinter.

Agripa competed in the 400 metres at the 1st IAAF World Championships in Athletics on 7 August 1983 in Helsinki with a time of 49:02. His personal best in the 400 metres was achieved on 12 May 1984 at Zomba, with a time of 48 seconds. That summer, Mwausegha ran in the 400 metres at the 1984 Summer Olympics in Los Angeles. He finished sixth in heat eight of the first round and did not progress to the semi-finals.

References

External links 
 
 
 

Malawian male sprinters
1956 births
Living people
Olympic athletes of Malawi
Athletes (track and field) at the 1984 Summer Olympics
Commonwealth Games competitors for Malawi
Athletes (track and field) at the 1982 Commonwealth Games
World Athletics Championships athletes for Malawi